SSAC may refer to:

 Massachusetts State Student Advisory Council
 MIT Sloan Sports Analytics Conference
 Safiuddin Sarker Academy and College
 Scottish Sub Aqua Club, a scuba training association
 Security and Stability Advisory Committee, a body that advises ICANN on strategic threats to the Internet
 Social Security Advisory Committee, an advisory body to the United Kingdom government on social security issues
 Society for the Study of Architecture in Canada, an architectural history organization in Canada, established in 1974
 Southern States Athletic Conference, a NAIA athletic conference in the United States
 West Virginia Secondary School Activities Commission